The Increased Difficulty of Concentration is the fourth studio album by Air Liquide, independently released on October 25, 1994 by Sm:)e Communications.

Track listing

Personnel 
Adapted from The Increased Difficulty of Concentration liner notes.

Air Liquide
 Mary Susan Applegate – spoken word
 Ingmar Koch (as Dr. Walker) – electronics, programming
 Cem Oral (as Jammin' Unit) – electronics, programming

Production and additional personnel
 Air Liquide – production
 Craig Bevan – mastering
 Yorck Dertinger – photography
 Rebecca Meek – art direction, design

Release history

References

External links 
 The Increased Difficulty of Concentration at Discogs (list of releases)

1994 albums
Air Liquide (band) albums